Rudy Cuzzetto is a Canadian politician, who was elected to the Legislative Assembly of Ontario in the 2018 provincial election. He represents the riding of Mississauga—Lakeshore as a member of the Progressive Conservative Party of Ontario.

Rudy grew up in Port Credit, where his original family home; the “Cuzzetto Residence”, is designated as a heritage property under the Ontario Heritage Act. His family heritage in Mississauga—Lakeshore dates back four generations. Before being elected, Cuzzetto was an auditor at Ford Motor for 31 years.  He has served on the local Ratepayers Association – including the Beautification, Education, and Security Committees – and Parent Councils, and as a board member and property manager at the Mississauga Canoe Club.

Currently, he is a Member of the Standing Committee on Estimates, Member, Standing Committee on Public Accounts and the interim Parliamentary Assistant to the President of the Treasury Board (Internal Audit).

Political career

2018 PC Party Nomination Irregularities 
The Progressive Conservative Party's nomination committee unanimously ruled on March 15, 2018, that Patrick Brown would not be eligible to run as a PC candidate in Barrie—Springwater—Oro-Medonte for the June 7, 2018 election. It was later reported by the National Post that a Snover Dhillon, a convicted fraudster banned by the federal Conservatives, played a role in all those nomination irregularities. The Globe and Mail reported that Snover Dhillon included Rudy Cuzzetto's picture on a not-for-profit fundraising poster. Rudy Cuzzetto's niece, Genevieve Gualtieri, was dating Patrick Brown at the time. Cuzzetto denied Dhillon worked for him.

43rd Parliament 
Cuzzetto introduced the successful Hungarian Heritage Month Act. Cuzzetto, Doug Ford and other MPPs met with Hungarian President Katalin Novak. Novak was nominated for the presidency by Viktor Orban. Many political scientists and watchdogs consider Hungary to have experienced democratic backsliding during Orbán's tenure. Orban and Novak are members of Hungary's right-wing populist and national-conservative party, Fidesz.

Election results

References

External links

Canadian auditors
Canadian people of Italian descent
Ford people
Living people
Politicians from Mississauga
Progressive Conservative Party of Ontario MPPs
Year of birth missing (living people)